Laura Kate Harvey (born 15 May 1980) is an English football manager and former player who currently manages OL Reign of the American National Women's Soccer League (NWSL). She holds USSF "A" and UEFA "A" coaching licenses.

Harvey previously managed the United States women's national under-20 soccer team, Utah Royals FC, Arsenal, and Birmingham City. She was also an assistant with the United States women's national soccer team and involved with the youth set-up of England women's national football team. Harvey was named FAWSL Coach of the Year in 2011 after guiding Arsenal to win the league title, FA Cup, and Continental Cup. She was named NWSL Coach of the Year in 2014, 2015, and 2021.

Personal life
Harvey grew up in Bulkington, a village in Warwickshire, England. She attended The George Eliot School in Nuneaton. Her father was a football coach who worked for The Football Association (FA) and Coventry City F.C. during her childhood. She began playing football at a young age. As a teenager, Harvey played for the Coventry City L.F.C. for six years. Harvey graduated from the University of Wolverhampton with a bachelor's degree in Sports Studies.

Playing career

At age 22, Harvey ruptured her ACL while playing for Birmingham City; she subsequently retired from playing. She previously played for Wolverhampton Wanderers W.F.C.

Managerial career

Club

Birmingham City Ladies, 2002–2007
Harvey was named assistant coach for Birmingham City L.F.C. in 2002. In 2007, she was named team manager.

Arsenal LFC, 2008–2012

In 2008, Harvey joined Arsenal L.F.C. as its first team coach. The following year, she was hired full-time as Assistant Academy Director and Reserve Team Manager.

In February 2010, Harvey was hired to replace Tony Gervaise as manager for the Arsenal L.F.C. Of her hiring, Harvey said, "It's a really proud moment for me. In women's football, especially domestically, it doesn't come any bigger than Arsenal. When you set out to coach and you know this is your dream and your love, you want to make it the best it can possibly be and in my eyes it doesn't get much bigger than this."

In 2011, Harvey was named FAWSL coach of the year after guiding the team to win the league title, FA Cup, and Continental Cup. She finished her tenure with Arsenal in 2012 having led the team to three consecutive league titles, two Continental Cups, and one FA Women's Cup.

Seattle Reign FC, 2013–2017

On 21 December 2012, Harvey was named head coach of Seattle Reign FC for the inaugural season of the National Women's Soccer League, a new professional league in the United States. The Reign faced a tough first half of the season and went 0–9–1 in their first ten games after all three of their American allocated players were unavailable: Hope Solo was out for wrist surgery and recovery, Amy Rodriguez was out for the season due to pregnancy, and Megan Rapinoe was returning mid-season after a six-month stint for Olympique Lyonnais. With the return of Solo, Rapinoe, and some additional lineup changes made during the early summer, the Reign turned their regular season record around and finished the season in seventh place with a 5–14–3 record. In August 2013, Harvey signed a contract extension with the Reign through 2017. She left the club in November 2017.

During the 2014 season, Harvey led the Reign to set a league record unbeaten streak of 16 games during the first part of the season. During the 16 game stretch, the team compiled a 13–0–3 record. The Reign finished first in the regular season clinching the NWSL Shield for the first time. After defeating the Washington Spirit 2–1 in the playoff semi-finals, the Reign were defeated 2–1 by FC Kansas City during the championship final. Following the regular season, Harvey was named the league's Coach of the Year. In December 2014, she was named FA Coach of the Year by the FA, and was a finalist for the FIFA World Coach of the Year.

During the 2015 season, Harvey led the Reign to finish first in the regular season clinching the NWSL Shield for the second consecutive season. After defeating the Washington Spirit 3–0 in a playoff semi-final, the Reign were defeated 1–0 by FC Kansas City during the championship final in Portland. Following the 2015 regular season, Harvey was named the league's Coach of the Year for the second consecutive time.

Harvey's Reign FC teams missed the playoffs in 2016 and 2017. On 7 November 2017, the Reign announced that Harvey had stepped down as head coach and general manager, and that the team had hired FC Kansas City coach Vlatko Andonovski, who had defeated Harvey's Reign FC teams in the 2014 and 2015 NWSL championship matches, on her recommendation.

Utah Royals FC, 2018–2019 
On 27 November 2017, Utah Royals FC announced Harvey as their head coach.

OL Reign, 2021– 
Harvey will return to OL Reign as head coach, where she previously coached from 2013 to 2017, after the 2020 Summer Olympics in August 2021.

International 
From 2005–2011, Harvey served as assistant coach for the England women's national football team at the U-17, U-19 and U-23 levels.

Harvey was named as coach of the U-23 USWNT for a tournament in Spring 2017, after coaching them through a January camp. She reportedly took on an expanded role with the United States Soccer Federation following her exit from the Seattle Reign FC organization.

From January 2020 to July 2021, Harvey was the head coach of the United States women's national under-20 soccer team; she also served as an assistant coach of the United States women's national soccer team.

Managerial honours
Arsenal
 FA Women's Premier League: 2009–10
 FA Women's Super League: 2011, 2012
 FA Women's League Cup: 2011, 2012
 Women's FA Cup: 2011

OL Reign
 NWSL Shield: 2014, 2015, 2022
 The Women's Cup: 2022

United States U-20
 CONCACAF Women's U-20 Championship: 2020

Individual
 NWSL Coach of the Year: 2014, 2015, 2021
 FA Coach of the Year: 2014
 FA Pro Game Female Elite Coach of the Year: 2014
 FA WSL Coach of the Year: 2011

References

External links

 Arsenal coach profile (archived)

1980 births
Living people
OL Reign coaches
National Women's Soccer League coaches
Arsenal W.F.C. managers
Birmingham City W.F.C. players
Women's Super League managers
English women's football managers
Alumni of the University of Wolverhampton
Women's association football midfielders
English women's footballers
Wolverhampton Wanderers W.F.C. players
Utah Royals FC coaches